Play On! is a musical adaptation of Shakespeare's Twelfth Night,  featuring the music of Duke Ellington, with a book by Cheryl L. West.  The musical resets the story in 1940s Harlem.

Production history
The original production, conceived by director Sheldon Epps, premiered in San Diego at the Old Globe Theatre in September 1996. After 19 previews, it opened on Broadway on March 20, 1997 at the Brooks Atkinson Theatre, where it ran for 61 performances. The cast included Tonya Pinkins, André De Shields, and Carl Anderson. An original cast recording was released on May 20, 1997 on Varèse Sarabande. A 1999 production of Play On! at the Pasadena Playhouse was recorded for the PBS series Great Performances.

The book, by playwright Cheryl L. West, departs from Twelfth Night'''s usual setting of Illyria, resetting the play's action and characters in 1940s Swing-era Harlem.

Synopsis
Vy comes to swinging 1940s Harlem to write songs for the Duke, Harlem's greatest band leader.  To overcome the sexist barriers of the time against women songwriters, she disguises herself as a man, Vy-man.  She finds the Duke in tears over his loss of Lady Liv, Harlem's "queen of the blues".  The Duke likes Vy-man's music, so he instructs the songwriter to go to the Cotton Club and present one of her songs as if it were a new song written by the Duke for Lady Liv. Lady Liv finds Vy-man charming, and a series of mistaken pairings results.

Meanwhile, several of the performers at the Cotton Club are rebelling against the overly serious and tyrannical club manager, Rev.  Since Rev has a crush on Lady Liv, the performers persuade him that he should woo her by learning to swing and scat, giving up his old fashioned ballads.  More confusion results before the truth is revealed, and the couples are appropriately united.

Songs

Act 1
"Take the A Train" (Music and Lyrics by Billy Strayhorn)
"Drop Me Off in Harlem" (Music by Duke Ellington, Lyrics by Nick Kenny)
"I've Got to Be a Rug Cutter" (Music and Lyrics by Duke Ellington)
"I Let a Song Go Out of My Heart" (Music and Lyrics by Duke Ellington, Irving Mills, Henry Nemo, John Redmond)
"C Jam Blues" (Music by Duke Ellington)
"Mood Indigo" (Music and Lyrics by Duke Ellington, Irving Mills, Albany Bigard)
"Don't Get Around Much Anymore" (Music by Duke Ellington, Lyrics by Bob Russell)
"Don't You Know I Care" (Music by Duke Ellington, Lyrics by Mack David)
"It Don't Mean a Thing (If It Ain't Got That Swing)" (Music by Duke Ellington. Lyrics by Irving Mills)
"I Got It Bad and That Ain't Good" (from Jump For Joy'') (Music by Duke Ellington. Lyrics by Paul Francis Webster)
"Hit Me With a Hot Note and Watch Me Bounce" (Music by Duke Ellington. Lyrics by Don George)
"I'm Just a Lucky So-and-So" (Music by Duke Ellington. Lyrics by Mack David)
"Everything But You" (Music and Lyrics by Duke Ellington, Don George, Harry James)
"Solitude" (Music and Lyrics by Duke Ellington, Eddie DeLange, Irving Mills)

Act 2
"Black Butterfly" (Music and Lyrics by Duke Ellington, Ben Carruthers, Irving Mills)
"I Ain't Got Nothin' But the Blues" (Music by Duke Ellington. Lyrics by Don George)
"I'm Beginning to See the Light" (Music by Duke Ellington, Don George, Harry James, Johnny Hodges)
"I Got It Bad and That Ain't Good" (reprise)
"I Didn't Know About You" (Music by Duke Ellington. Lyrics by Bob Russell)
"Rocks in My Bed" (Music and Lyrics by Duke Ellington)
"Something to Live For" (Music by Duke Ellington. Lyrics by Billy Strayhorn)
"Love You Madly" (Music and Lyrics by Duke Ellington)
"Prelude to a Kiss" (Music and Lyrics by Duke Ellington, Irving Gordon, Irving Mills)
"In a Mellow Tone" (Music by Duke Ellington. Lyrics by Milt Gabler)

Awards and nominations

Original Broadway production

References

External links

1997 musicals
Broadway musicals
Plays and musicals based on Twelfth Night
Swing music
Duke Ellington songs